A corallivore is an animal that feeds on coral. Corallivores are an important group of reef organism because they can influence coral abundance, distribution, and community structure. Corallivores feed on coral using a variety of unique adaptations and strategies. Animals known to be corallivores include certain mollusks, annelids, fish, crustaceans, flatworms and echinoderms. The first recorded evidence of corallivory was presented by Charles Darwin in 1842 during his voyage on HMS Beagle in which he found coral in the stomach of two Scarus parrotfish.

History
While visiting the Cocos (Keeling) Islands in 1842, Charles Darwin was told by an Englishman living on the islands that there were large shoals of parrotfish that subsisted entirely on coral. Darwin dissected several parrotfish and found pieces of coral and finely ground calcareous material in their stomach. This led Darwin to correctly theorize that some species of parrotfish consume coral and contribute sediment to the environment by passing finely ground particles from coral skeletons.

In 1952, the first descriptions of organisms actively consuming coral were written by Jacques Cousteau and published in National Geographic. During his trip to the Red Sea aboard RV Calypso, Cousteau swam with a pair of green humphead parrotfish and watched them take regular bites and leaving white scars on the coral around them. Like Darwin, Cousteau also noticed the sediment particles that were produced in the parrotfishs' waste and settled to the seafloor. Cousteau noted the leisurely speed with which the parrotfish consumed the coral and remarked that they appeared "unhurried" and like "sea cows, browsing on stone pastures."

The term "corallivore" comes from the Latin word corallum for coral and -vora for to eat or devour.

Types
Approximately one-third of known corallivores are obligate corallivores, while the remaining three-fourths are facultative corallivores. Obligate corallivory is defined as having a diet which is at least 80% coral. Obligate corallivores are present in all tropical oceans, except the Caribbean. Facultative corallivores are defined as organisms that regularly consume coral without it comprising a large percentage of their diet.

It is thought that some facultative corallivores, such as some damselfish, eat coral to promote algal growth. Many facultative corallivores also graze on algae, which competes with coral for space and resources. By grazing coral, it may provide better conditions for algal growth. Aggressive grazing may keep the algal community in a state of accelerated growth, effectively preventing the transition to a slower growing community.

Feeding strategies
Organisms display different strategies for consuming coral. The majority of corallivores feed on stony coral, however, a few species feed on soft coral. There are no known obligate soft coral feeder; soft coral is estimated to be a small percentage of the diet of soft coral feeders. The most common genera of coral consumed are Acropora, Pocillopora, Montipora, and Porites. Only 18 out of the 111 described coral genera are known to be consumed by corallivores.

Mucus feeders
Mucus feeders feed exclusively on coral mucus. Coral regularly slough off mucus into the surrounding water, so it is thought that mucus feeding causes no harm to the coral. However, it has been shown to disrupt microbial communities living on the coral. Many mucus feeders have shown a preference towards damaged corals, which typically produce more mucus than undamaged corals.

Browsers
Browsers eat coral tissue without damaging the coral's calcium carbonate skeleton. The majority of corallivore species are browsers.

Scrapers
Scrapers consume live coral tissue and small portions of the coral's calcium carbonate skeleton.

Excavators
Excavators consume live coral tissue and large portions of the coral's calcium carbonate skeleton. Excavators can be further broken down to "spot biters" and "focused biters". Spot biters take bites that are scattered over a colony's surface, while focused biters bite repeatedly in the same area. At one time, focused biting was thought to be a display of territoriality in parrotfish, but was later determined to be for food. Out of all of the kinds of corallivores, excavators are thought to have the biggest impact on coral reef communities due to the large amount of coral and skeleton consumed. Additionally, studies suggest that the damage from excavating takes significantly longer to heal than other types of corallivory.

Bioeroders
Bioeroders consume dead coral substrate. Bioeroders are thought to help reshape coral reef landscapes by eroding dead corals.

In nature

Corallivory is relatively rare in nature; less than 3% of known fish species, four families of crustaceans, four families of gastropods, and a few echinoderm genera have been identified as corallivores. Corallivores are present in all tropical reef regions. The region with the highest proportion of corallivorous organisms is the tropical eastern Pacific Ocean.

Fish 
Butterflyfish constitute a large percentage of the known corallivores; of the 128 known corallivorous fish species, 69 are butterflyfish species. Additionally, 50% of butterflyfish species are corallivores, making corallivory their most common feeding method. Corallivorous fish come from 11 different families. 39 species are obligate corallivores.

Butterflyfish have a wide range of adaptations that facilitate coral consumption. Some butterflyfish have long mouth that they use like forceps to pluck off individual coral polyps and some use their teeth to scrape off coral tissue. Butterflyfish that consume coral have longer intestines than fish that do not consume coral, suggesting that corallivores need more time to process the complex molecules of the coral.

The golden pufferfish is distributed widely across the tropical oceans, however, is considered a particularly significant corallivore, specifically in the tropical Eastern Pacific. Despite the large amount of coral consumed, studies suggest that the golden pufferfish has little influence on coral abundance in the region.

Parrotfish are a family of fish that contain several corallivorous species. Reef-dwelling parrotfish have teeth on their lower and upper jaw that have evolved into an edge for cutting. This cutting edge allows parrotfish to scrape and feed on coral tissue and skeleton. The cutting edge on the teeth of parrotfish resembles a beak, which is the basis for the organism's common name. In addition to the cutting edge adaptation, parrotfish also have well-developed crossed joints that connect the dentary and articular bones of the lower jaw, which presents a mechanical advantage that makes the bite much stronger.

Invertebrates 
There are 48 known corallivorous invertebrate species, 14 of which are obligate corallivores. The facultative corallivore crown-of-thorns star is an important coral browser that feeds by everting its stomach and using its tube feet to spread the stomach over the coral and into the crevices between polyps. Occurrences of high crown-of-thorns star population densities has resulted in documented decimation of large coral reef tracts, with reports of 100% coral mortality in localized areas.

The genus Drupella are obligate corallivorous sea snails that specialize on fast growing Acropora and Montipora species. Like crown-of-thorns star, Drupella aggregations have been known to destroy large areas of coral, and have been cited as the cause for instances of significant coral reduction in Toga Bay, Japan and Ningaloo Reef, Australia.

Most corallivores display a preference for one or a few types of coral. However, the obligate corallivore snail, Coralliophila abbreviata, is known to feed on 26 different species of coral and shows no distinct preference for one species. C. abbreviata lacks a radula that would allow it to scrape off coral tissue, so coral is broken down by digestive enzymes.

Not all corallivores are detrimental to coral health. Corals with populations of the mucus feeding Tetralia and Trapezia crabs were shown to have a greater chance of survival during an crown-of-thorns star outbreak. Trapezia crabs are known to symbiotically benefit their host coral by cleaning sediment and debris off their surface.

Some organisms receive more than nutrition. The nudibranch, Phestilla sibogae, has been known to incorporate zooxanthellae, a phytoplankton symbiont, harvested through corallivory into its cerata. After they are incorporated, the zooxanthellae continue to photosynthesize and provide energy for the nudibranch.

Impacts on ecosystem 
 Corallivory often results in damage to coral or loss of coral biomass, and sometime directly causes coral death. Corals divert energy and resources towards repairing damage, which has shown to suppress additional growth. The ability for a coral to repair itself is partially based on the size of the lesion; since not all damage can be healed, superfluous damage can result in permanent change to the reef. Corals have shown to energetically prioritize repairing damage over reproducing, so corallivory can have a negative effect on coral reproduction. Additionally, studies have shown that grazing by corallivores can be associated with reduced zooxanthellae densities.

Scientists believe that excessive fishing of predators to corallivores, like large piscivorous fish, may result in an increase in corallivore abundance. This increase in corallivory may have a future negative effect on coral health and density.

Corallivory can indirectly cause an increase in growth of competitive organisms, such as algae and sponges. Additionally, some corallivores have been implicated in the spread of coral diseases. Some studies have shown that corallivores can have an influence on the competitive abilities of coral colonies.

Corallivory is not always detrimental to coral reefs. If the species of coral being consumed is spatially dominant, grazing can help control growth and promote greater reef diversity.

Corallivores are often sensitive to declines in coral health and population size, and are negatively affected during periods of high coral loss. In particular, obligate corallivores have been reported to experience high population declines following instances of coral loss. Studies have shown that corallivores suffer during bleaching events, suggesting that bleached coral is not as nutritional as healthy coral. Scientific investigation into the nutritional value of healthy and bleached coral is lacking. However, it has been determined that the disparity in nutritional value is not related to the concentration of zooxanthellae.

Known corallivores
This list contains the majority of known corallivores, as research is actively ongoing.

See also

 Parrotfish
 Pufferfish
 Butterflyfish
 Triggerfish
 Wrasse
 Damselfish
 Acanthaster planci
 Arothron meleagris
 Architectonicidae
 Epitoniidae
 Pediculariidae
 Muricidae
 Drupella
 Coralliophila

References

Marine animals
Animals by eating behaviors